Vellalar (also called Velalar and Karalar) are a Tamil community in the state of Tamil Nadu.

The following is a list of some subcastes of the Vellalar:

Arunattu Vellalar.
Chozhia Vellalar (also spelt as Sozhiya Vellalar)
Karkathar Vellalar
Kondaikatti Vellalar
Kongu Vellalar (commonly known as Kongu Gounder)
Nankudi Vellalar or Narkudi Vellalar (also known as Sivakalai Pillaimar)
Sri Lankan Vellalar
Thondaimandala Vellalar
Thuluva Vellalar

References

List
Social groups of Tamil Nadu